Roberto Aceves,  (September 25, 1916 – June 26, 1994), better known under the ring name Bobby Bonales, was a Mexican luchador, or professional wrestler who was active during the early days of Lucha Libre in Mexico, making his debut in 1934. Aceves son Daniel Aceves is an Olympic medal winner in Greco-Roman wrestling. As Bonales Aceves held several championships including the NWA World Welterweight Championship, the Mexican National Middleweight Championship and the Mexican National Lightweight Championship. In recent years Mexican wrestling promotion Consejo Mundial de Lucha Libre (CMLL) has honored Bonales on several occasions. Known as La Maravilla Moreliana ("The Marvel from Morelia"); Bonales innovated the Topé Suicida wrestling moves.

Professional wrestling career
Roberto Aceves was born in Morelia, Michoacán, Mexico but at the age of 8 his family moved to Mexico City. By the age of 14 Aceves began training to become a professional wrestler and made his  debut in 1934. Adopting the ring name Bobby Bonales he began working for promoter Salvador Lutteroth and his newly founded Empresa Mexicana de Lucha Libre (EMLL) during the early days of Lucha libre in Mexico. On September 27, 1936 Bonales lost to Chong Yip on the undercard of the EMLL 3rd Anniversary Show. During the following years Bonales worked his way up the ranks and on May 5, 1940 he defeated Jack O'Brien to win the Mexican National Lightweight Championship. He later lost the championship to Dientes Hernandez. On April 6, 1941 Lobo Negro defeated Bonales in a match for the vacant Mexican National Welterweight Championship. Bonales became one of the first wrestlers to train under Diablo Velasco, during which time he developed a new move called a Topé Suicida, a move where he would dive through the ring ropes out of the ring, striking his opponent with a headbutt. The Topé Suicida became one of the signature moves of the Lucha Libre style, emphasizing the high flying style. Bonales wrestled on the first show of the newly built Arena Coliseo when it opened on April 2, 1943. Later that same year Bonales began a high profile storyline feud with El Santo, who at the time was an emerging performer in Mexico. On June 11, 1943 Bobby Bonales defeated El Santo to win the Mexican National Middleweight Championship as part of that storyline. The two met in the main event of the EMLL 10th Anniversary Show where El Santo defeated Bonales in one of the earliest Luchas de Apuestas, or "bet match", after which he was shaved bald. Later on El Santo would regain the Middleweight championship, but Bonales became a two-time champion on June 1, 1945 when he defeated El Santo for the title once again. His second run with the Middleweight Championship ended at the EMLL 12th Anniversary Show when Gory Guerrero defeated Bonales Three years later Bonales and Guerrero fought each other at both of the EMLL 15th Anniversary Shows, splitting the matches between the two. The following year at the EMLL 16th Anniversary Show Bonales teamed up with Tarzán López to defeat El Santo and Gory Guerrero in the main event of the show. On July 11, 1952 defeated Gory Guerrero to win the NWA World Welterweight Championship only to lose it to El Santo two months later.

In 1962 Bonales made his debut in a Lucha film, playing himself in a movie called Santo vs. las Mujeres Vampiro ("Santo versus the Vampire Women") which was later dubbed into English under the title "Samson vs. the Vampire Women". Bonales retired from active, in-ring competition in the mid 1960s and focused on training instead. Early on he trained José de Jesús Díaz Mendoza, who later became known as Villano I as well as his brother José Alfredo Díaz Mendoza, also known as Villano II prior to the Mendoza brother's debut in 1969. Later on he would train his son Daniel Aceves in amateur wrestling, starting him off on a career that would see Daniel represent Mexico at the 1984 Summer Olympics in Los Angeles. Aceves won a silver medal in the Men's Greco-Roman 52 kg.

Death and legacy
Aceves died from cancer on June 26, 1994 at the age of 77, survived by his son Daniel. In 2009 Consejo Mundial de Lucha Libre (CMLL), the renamed EMLL, honored Bobby Bonales by awarding a trophy, the Copa Bobby Bonales to the wrestler voted the "Best Technical wrestler" for that year. The first recipient was Blue Panther, followed by Negro Casas in 2010 and Atlantis in 2010. CMLL did not award the Copay Bobby Bonales from 2011 to 2013 but in 2014 they brought it back and awarded it to Último Guerrero. On March 2, 2012 CMLL honored Bonales as part of their 2012 Homenaje a Dos Leyendas ("Homage to two legends"), including an in-ring dedication to Bonales during the show and presenting his son Daniel with a commemorative plaque in Bonales' honor.

Copa Bobby Bonales winners

Championships and accomplishments
Empresa Mexicana de Lucha Libre
Mexican National Lightweight Championship (1 time)
Mexican National Middleweight Championship (2 times)
NWA World Welterweight Championship (1 time)

Luchas de Apuestas record

References

1916 births
1994 deaths
Mexican male professional wrestlers
Professional wrestlers from Michoacán
People from Morelia
Deaths from cancer in Mexico
Sportspeople from Mexico City
Mexican National Middleweight Champions
NWA World Welterweight Champions
20th-century professional wrestlers